Claude Bourgelat (27 March 1712 – 3 January 1779) was a French veterinary surgeon. He was a founder of scientifically informed veterinary medicine, and he created one of the earliest schools for training professional veterinarians.

Life and career
Bourgelat was born at Lyon. He initially studied law and worked as a barrister, but he became interested in veterinary medicine because of his interest in horses.

In 1740, at the age of 28, Bourgelat became the head of the Lyon Academy of Horsemanship. As an amateur horsemanship enthusiast, he developed a style of horse riding that is still used as of today. In 1750 Bourgelat wrote a book on the topic of veterinary medicine, in which he considered the idea of founding a veterinary school. He followed through on the idea in 1761 (also variously given as 1762 or 1764), when he co-founded the veterinary colleges at Lyon. He founded the veterinary college specifically to combat the cattle plague (also called the rinderpest), and students trained at the Lyon veterinary college were credited with helping to cure the disease.

Bourgelat was noted for being an early practitioner of scientifically informed veterinary medicine, which incorporated ideas from natural history, chemistry, clinical medicine, and comparative anatomy.

Bourgalet was a member of the French Academy of Sciences and the Prussian Academy of Sciences. He also contributed to Diderot and d'Alambert's Encyclopédie.

Selected works 
Élémens d'hippiatrique, ou, Nouveaux principes sur la connoissance et sur la médecine des chevaux (1750)
 L'art vétérinaire (1761)
 Matiere médicale raisonnée; ou, Précis des médicamens considérés dans leurs effets, a l'usage des éleves de l'Ecole royale vétérinaire; avec les formules médicinales. Lyon, Jean-Marie Bruyset (1765)
 Lehrbegriff der medicinischen Materie; oder, Beschreibung der einfachen Arzeneyen nach ihren Wirkungen; nebst den Medicinischen Formeln. Zum Gebrauche der Lehrlinge in der königl. Vieharzeneyschule zu Lyon. Aus dem Französischen übersetzt. Leipzig, M. G. Wiedmanns Erben und Reich (1766)
 Matiere médicale raisonnée, ou, Précis des médicamens considérés dans leurs effets. Lyon, Chez Jean-Marie Bruyset (1771)
 Elémens de l'art vétérinaire. Précis anatomique du corps du cheval, à l'usage des éleves des écoles vétérinaires. Paris, Vallat-la-Chapelle (1791)

See also 
 Marc Mammerickx: Claude Bourgelat: avocat des vétérinaires, Bruxelles 1971
 Hugues Plaideux, « L'inventaire après décès de Claude Bourgelat », in Bulletin de la Société française d'histoire de la médecine et des sciences vétérinaires, 10, 2010, p. 125-158.on line
 Hugues Plaideux, « La descendance de Claude Bourgelat », in Bulletin de la Société française d'histoire de la médecine et des sciences vétérinaires, 12, 2012, p. 161-176. on line
 Bourgelat, Claude, in: Frank Arthur Kafker, The encyclopedists as individuals: a biographical dictionary of the authors of the Encyclopédie, Oxford 1988, p. 67–71.
 Richard Tagand: Claude Bourgelat, écuyer lyonnais, 1712–1779, in: Revue de médecine vétérinaire 1959, p. 888–897.
 Alcide Railliet, Léon Moulé: Histoire de l'École d'Alfort, Paris 1908, online  
 Louis Furcy Grognier: Notice historique et raisonnée sur C. Bourgelat, Fondateur des écoles vétérinaires; ou l'on trouve un aperçu statistique sur ces établissemens, Paris [u.a.] 1805

References

1712 births
1779 deaths
Physicians from Lyon
Contributors to the Encyclopédie (1751–1772)
Members of the French Academy of Sciences
Members of the Prussian Academy of Sciences
French veterinarians
French male non-fiction writers
18th-century French male writers